Saturday Night Blues is a compilation album of recordings by Canadian blues performers, released by Stony Plain Records and the Canadian Broadcasting Corporation in 1991. Subtitled "The Great Canadian Blues Project, Volume 1", the album was released as a tie-in to the CBC Radio program Saturday Night Blues, and was compiled from a mix of previously-released material, new unreleased recordings and performance tapes from the CBC Radio archives. It was one of the first significant compilations of the work of Canadian blues artists.

The album was a cowinner, with Loreena McKennitt's The Visit, of the 1992 Juno Award for Best Roots and Traditional Album of the Year.

A sequel album, Saturday Night Blues: 20 Years, was issued in 2006.

Critical response
Mark Miller of The Globe and Mail gave the album a mixed review, calling some of the songs excellent but criticizing the album for including only one woman and only one artist from the vibrant blues scene in Quebec. Helen Metella of the Edmonton Journal reviewed the album positively, writing that "these 20 cuts acknowledge the tremendous variety and top drawer quality of northern blues."

Track listing

References

1991 compilation albums
Blues compilation albums
Blues albums by Canadian artists
Compilation albums by Canadian artists
CBC Radio